William Johnstone Milne VC (21 December 1892 – 9 April 1917) was a First World War Canadian soldier. Milne was a posthumous recipient of the Victoria Cross, the highest and most prestigious award for gallantry in the face of the enemy that can be awarded to British and Commonwealth forces. He received the VC for his actions at the Battle of Vimy Ridge on 9 April 1917.

Details
Milne was born on 21 December 1892 in Scotland and moved to Canada in 1910. He worked on a farm near Moose Jaw, Saskatchewan before joining the army in September 1915.

Milne was 24 years old and a private in the 16th (The Canadian Scottish) Battalion, Canadian Expeditionary Force on 9 April 1917 near Thelus, France, during the Battle of Vimy Ridge, where his actions led to the award of the Victoria Cross.

His citation reads: 

Four soldiers earned the Victoria Cross in the Battle of Vimy Ridge; the others were Thain Wendell MacDowell, Ellis Wellwood Sifton and John George Pattison.

Milne's body was never found. He is commemorated on the Vimy Memorial.

The medal

References

Further reading
Monuments to Courage (David Harvey, 1999)
The Register of the Victoria Cross (This England, 1997)
Scotland's Forgotten Valour (Graham Ross, 1995)

External links
 William Johnstone Milne's digitized service file
 William Johnstone Milne on the Canadian Virtual War Memorial
 Short biography of William Johnstone Milne on DND's Directorate of History and Heritage
The Canadian Scottish Regiment (Princess Mary's) Warrant Officers' and Sergeants' Mess (Private William Johnstone Milne entry)
 News Item (Canadian Scottish Regiment (Princess Mary's) regimental museum VC exhibition)
 Legion Magazine Article on William Johnstone Milne
 
 Canadian Scottish Museum

Canadian World War I recipients of the Victoria Cross
1892 births
1917 deaths
Canadian military personnel killed in World War I
Scottish emigrants to Canada
Canadian Expeditionary Force soldiers
Scottish military personnel
People from Cambusnethan
Canadian Scottish Regiment (Princess Mary's) soldiers